The women's 800 metres event at the 1998 World Junior Championships in Athletics was held in Annecy, France, at Parc des Sports on 28, 29 and 31 July.

Medalists

Results

Final
31 July

Semifinals
29 July

Semifinal 1

Semifinal 2

Heats
28 July

Heat 1

Heat 2

Heat 3

Heat 4

Participation
According to an unofficial count, 27 athletes from 24 countries participated in the event.

References

800 metres
800 metres at the World Athletics U20 Championships